The Anchoress may refer to:

 The Anchoress (book), a 2015 novel
 The Anchoress (musician), stage name of musician Catherine Anne Davies

See also
 Anchoress, a type of female religious recluse